The Benjamin Gordon Baldwin House (also known as Baldwin Heights) is a historic house located at 26 Baldwin Avenue in Norwood, St. Lawrence County, New York.

Description and history 
The house was built in 1861 as an Italianate-style single family dwelling.

It was listed on the National Register of Historic Places on September 15, 2004.

References

Houses on the National Register of Historic Places in New York (state)
Italianate architecture in New York (state)
Houses completed in 1861
Houses in St. Lawrence County, New York
1861 establishments in New York (state)
National Register of Historic Places in St. Lawrence County, New York